Stefka Petrova, (b. 1950) is a prominent Bulgarian nutritionist and the director of the National Center of Public Health Protection (NCPHP), Sofia, Bulgaria. She is also the national consultant on nutrition at the Bulgarian Ministry of Health. She holds a Doctor of Medicine degree and PhD from Sofia Medical University.

Petrova see patients at the Nadezhda hospital.

References

External links
 National Center of Public Health Protection
 

Bulgarian public health doctors
Nutritionists
Bulgarian health officials
1950 births
Living people
Women nutritionists
Women public health doctors